Shake! is an album by the blues-rock group the Siegel–Schwall Band.  Their third album, it was released in 1968 by Vanguard Records as a vinyl LP.  It was later re-released as a CD, also on the Vanguard label.

Shake! was the group's last album to feature Jack Dawson on bass guitar and Russ Chadwick on drums.

Critical reception

On Allmusic, Cub Koda wrote, "Shake! was probably the group's second best album and certainly the one that came the closest to representing their live act....  Lots of fun and fireworks on this one, the sound of a band at the top of their game."

Track listing
Side one:
"Shake For Me" (Willie Dixon) – 4:46
"My Starter Won't Start" (Lightnin' Hopkins) – 4:46
"Jim Jam" (Jim Schwall) – 2:22
"Louise, Louise Blues" (J. Mayo Williams, Johnny Temple) – 2:45
"Wouldn't Quit You" (Corky Siegel) – 2:07
Side two:
"You Can't Run That Fast" (Schwall) – 3:00
"Think" (Siegel) – 2:36
"334-3599" (Schwall) – 2:31
"Rain Falling Down" (Schwall) – 2:37
"Get Away Man" (Siegel) – 3:08
"Yes I Love You" (Siegel) – 2:49

Personnel
Siegel–Schwall Band
Corky Siegel – harmonica, piano, vocals
Jim Schwall – guitar, vocals
Jack Dawson – bass
Russ Chadwick – drums
Production
Samuel Charters – producer
Dave Holtz - design
Merk Roth - photography

References

Siegel–Schwall Band albums
1968 albums
Albums produced by Samuel Charters
Vanguard Records albums